Evilasio Leite da Costa (born in Brazil), known as just Evilásio, is a Brazilian footballer, who is playing for Futebol Clube Santa Cruz.

Club career
He briefly played for APOEL in Cyprus, coming from Porto Alegre Futebol Clube, in Brazil with his friend Marcos Tavares.

Evilásio has played in the Copa do Brasil for Vasco da Gama AC, Nacional and Esportivo.

References

External links
Profile at Soccerway
Profile at goal.com

1980 births
Living people
Brazilian footballers
Brazilian expatriate footballers
APOEL FC players
Porto Alegre Futebol Clube players
Pelita Bandung Raya players
Rio Claro Futebol Clube players
Cypriot First Division players
Liga 1 (Indonesia) players
Expatriate footballers in Cyprus
Expatriate footballers in Indonesia
Brazilian expatriate sportspeople in Cyprus
Brazilian expatriate sportspeople in Indonesia
Association football forwards